Saral Rural District is a rural district (dehestan) in Saral District, Divandarreh County, Kurdistan Province, Iran. At the 2006 census, its population was 6,869, in 1,336 families. The rural district has 32 villages.

References 

Rural Districts of Kurdistan Province
Divandarreh County